Éric Rochant  (born 24 February 1961) is a French film director and screenwriter. He is an alumnus of the IDHEC (FEMIS) from the generation of Arnaud Desplechin and Noémie Lvovsky. Rochant is of Jewish background.

Filmography

References

External links

 

1961 births
Living people
French people of Jewish descent
Film directors from Paris
French male screenwriters
French screenwriters